The Delta River is an  tributary of the Tanana River in the U.S. state of Alaska. Its name in the Ahtna language is Saas Na’ . Fed by the Tangle Lakes of the Alaska Range, the river flows north to meet the larger river near Big Delta.

In 1980,  of waterways in the Delta River basin, including all of the Tangle Lakes and the main stem to within  of Black Rapids became part of the National Wild and Scenic Rivers System. Of this,  are designated "wild",  "scenic", and  "recreational".

Boating
Easily accessible from the boat launch at the Tangle Lakes campground near the Denali Highway and at many points downstream along the Richardson Highway, the river can be floated in sections that vary in difficulty from Class I (easy) to Class V (extremely difficult) on the International Scale of River Difficulty and may require portages. The upstream stretches include four lakes and their Class II (medium) connecting channels. A  portage leads to a  stretch of Class III (difficult) rapids.

Below the Class III rapids, the river continues through  of Class I and II water before entering a  stretch between Ann Creek and One Mile Creek known as Black Rapids.

Author Karen Jettmar warns of dangers including "sweepers, canoe fragments wrapped around rocks, bears, cold and wet weather, and high winds". She says that "only experts should attempt to run Black Rapids (Class IV–V) below Mile 229 on Richardson Highway."

Fishing
In the deeper lakes of the system, lake trout are fairly abundant. Lakes and streams that are away from the highway and accessible only by canoe or trail are the least heavily fished. Arctic grayling fishing is also considered excellent on the upper river down to its confluence with Eureka Creek.

See also
Delta River Canoe Trail
List of rivers of Alaska

References

External links
The Delta National Wild and Scenic River – Bureau of Land Management

Alaska Range
Rivers of Alaska
Rivers of Copper River Census Area, Alaska
Rivers of Southeast Fairbanks Census Area, Alaska
Rivers of Unorganized Borough, Alaska
Tributaries of the Yukon River
Wild and Scenic Rivers of the United States
Tanana Athabaskans